The following is a list of football managers and head coaches who have won the Scottish league championship, currently known as the Scottish Premiership.

Some managers have also won the other two major competitions in Scottish football, which are the Scottish Cup and the Scottish League Cup. This results in a manager winning a "double" (two competitions in one season) or a "treble" (all three in one season). There are also three national lower league championships and a national cup competition for lower league clubs, called the Scottish Challenge Cup.

League

Scottish League Championship

By individual

By nationality

Lower Leagues (Tiers 2–4)

Treble and Double winning managers

League, Scottish Cup and League Cup "domestic" treble

League and Scottish Cup double

League and League Cup double

Scottish Cup and League Cup double

Notes

References

Scotland League and Cup winners
League and Cup winning managers